HWG may refer to:
 Harlem Writers Guild
 Hostage Working Group, organized by the United States Department of State during the Iraq War